The women's 400 m freestyle swimming events for the 2016 Summer Paralympics take place at the Rio Olympic Stadium from 8 to 15 September. A total of seven events are contested for seven different classifications.

Competition format
Each event consists of two rounds: heats and final. The top eight swimmers overall in the heats progress to the final. If there are eight or fewer swimmers in an event, no heats are held and all swimmers qualify for the final.

Results

S6

The S6 event took place on 13 September.

S7

The S7 event took place on 14 September.

S8

The S8 event took place on 8 September.

S9

The S9 event took place on 9 September.

S10

The S10 event took place on 15 September.

S11

The S11 event took place on 10 September.

S13

The S13 event took place on 12 September.

References

Swimming at the 2016 Summer Paralympics